Minaveha, or Kukuya, is an Oceanic language of Fergusson Island in Milne Bay Province, Papua New Guinea.

References

Nuclear Papuan Tip languages
Languages of Milne Bay Province